Muhammad Arif Rahmani  is an ethnic Hazara politician from Afghanistan. He is the former representative of the people of Ghazni province in the 16th and 17th rounds of the Wolesi Jirga (Parliament of Afghanistan).

Early life 
Muhammad Arif Rahmani was born in 1975 in Qarabagh District, Ghazni, Ghazni province. In 2007 he received a bachelor's degree in Islamic Education and Law from the University of Markaz Jahan Ulom Islami.

Personal life 
Muhammad Arif Rahmani is married and has two children.

References 

Hazara politicians
Members of the House of the People (Afghanistan)
People from Ghazni Province
Living people
1975 births